Grape Solar is a renewable energy company headquartered in Eugene, Oregon, which is dedicated to the manufacturing and marketing of solar photovoltaic modules. They manufacture solar power kits which are available from a number of retailers, including Home Depot, Costco, and Amazon. Grape solar was originally known as Centron Solar, but was forced to change its name after a lawsuit with German solar company Centrosolar.

Products
Grape Solar manufactures a full line of solar photovoltaic modules for a variety of on grid and off grid applications. Grape Solar's special offering of the 180w made in USA solar module is the highest efficiency 36 cell solar module available in consumer market.

Reception
Their 250-watt module has received a positive review on Top Ten Reviews, garnering an 8.58 out of 10 points, for its efficiency and affordability.

References

Solar energy companies of the United States
Energy in Oregon
Companies based in Eugene, Oregon